Tominanga aurea is a species of fish in the subfamily Telmatherininae part of the family Melanotaeniidae, the rainbowfishes. It is endemic to Lake Mahalona in Sulawesi, Indonesia.

References
 

aurea
Freshwater fish of Indonesia
Taxonomy articles created by Polbot
Fish described  in 1990